Kjell-Erik Bertil Ståhl (born 17 February 1946 in Killeberg, Skåne) is a retired long-distance runner from Sweden. He represented his native country twice at the Summer Olympics (1980 and 1984) in the men's marathon, finishing in 19th place in Moscow. Ståhl twice won the Stockholm Marathon. He holds the Swedish marathon record with 2:10:38 set in 1983.

He holds the Single Age World Record in the marathon for men who are 49 years of age, at 2:19:47, set on 10 June 1995 in Stockholm (source: Association of Road Racing Statisticians, updated 1 Nov 2019).

In 2007 the German issue of Runners World featured an article about him.

In one 12-month period, between August 1981 and August 1982 he ran 14 marathons with an average finishing time of 2:16:11. Between 1979 and 1998 he completed 101 marathons. In 70 of those, he finished in under two hours and twenty minutes, winning 17. He won the 1986 Stockholm marathon at the age of 40 in 2:12:33. In 1983, three weeks before the World Championship in Helsinki, he ran 190 km in a week, while employed full time.

His personal bests included:

800m 1:56.8 (1967)
1,500m 3:54.5 (1973)
3,000m steeplechase 8:46.7 (1974)
5000m 14:11.9 min (1979)
10,000m 29:48.0 min (1979)
Marathon in 2:10:38 (1983)

Achievements

References

External links

1949 births
Living people
Swedish male long-distance runners
Swedish male marathon runners
Athletes (track and field) at the 1980 Summer Olympics
Athletes (track and field) at the 1984 Summer Olympics
Olympic athletes of Sweden
World record holders in masters athletics
Swedish masters athletes
People from Osby Municipality
Frankfurt Marathon male winners
Sportspeople from Skåne County